Algirdas Paleckis (born 20 May 1971) is a Lithuanian diplomat, politician, columnist, leader of the political movement The Dawn of Justice. Šiauliai district court convicted Paleckis for spying for Russia in July 2021. The conviction was upheld by the Lithuanian Court of Appeal in May 2022.

Biography
Algirdas Paleckis was born on 20 May 1971, in Bern, Switzerland, the son of Soviet diplomat Justas Vincas Paleckis. His grandfather was Justas Paleckis, a journalist and a foreign correspondent in 1930s who later became a communist and the speaker of the Supreme Soviet of Lithuanian SSR following the Soviet invasion.

In 1994, Paleckis graduated from Vilnius University with a master's degree in journalism and international relations.

Career
From 1997 to 2001, Paleckis was the 1st secretary at Lithuania's Permanent Mission to the EU in Brussels becoming Head of West European Division at the Ministry of Foreign Affairs of Lithuania in 2001, a post in which he remained until 2003. From 15 November 2004, to 17 April 2007, he was a member of Lithuanian Parliament. Later, Paleckis was an assemblyman of the Council of Europe from 24 January 2005 to 5 May 2007 and worked as a Vice-Mayor of Vilnius during 2007 to 2008. In 2008 he founded the Front Party and was its leader until November 2014. He is fluent in Lithuanian, English, French, Russian and German.

Criminal prosecution

In 2011, Lithuanian authorities initiated prosecution against Paleckis for his alleged denial of Soviet aggression against Lithuania. As part of his journalistic research, Paleckis claimed he had found several witnesses and ballistic assessments that seemed to indicate that there were secret snipers on the roof near the Vilnius TV centre who were shooting civilians. He then stated publicly that "it appears that in January 1991 our own people were shooting at their natives". A Vilnius court had vindicated Paleckis in January 2012. The prosecution had appealed and Paleckis was sentenced to a fine of 10,400 litas (€3,100) on 12 June 2012.

He was arrested again in 2018 on suspicion of spying for Russia. As of March 2020, he had been jailed without conviction (or start of legal proceedings) for more than 500 days. The Lithuanian authorities argued against granting bail on the grounds that Paleckis had lived in Moscow, had connections there and could flee from the country. Paleckis was released on supervision in April 2020. On 27 July 2021, Šiauliai district court found Paleckis guilty and sentenced him to six years in prison. The conviction was upheld by the Lithuanian Court of Appeal on 6 May 2022.

Bibliography
 Antrankiai minčiai ("Handcuffs for Mind"). Auth. Algirdas Paleckis. Vilnius, 2021. ISBN 978-609-475-702-0

Electoral history

2016 Lithuanian parliamentary election

References

1971 births
Living people
Vilnius University alumni
Members of the Seimas
21st-century Lithuanian politicians
Lithuanian politicians convicted of crimes
People convicted of spying for the Russian Federation